The Last Ship is an American action-drama television series, loosely based on the 1988 novel of the same name by William Brinkley. The series premiered on TNT on June 22, 2014, and concluded after five seasons on November 11, 2018.

Premise
After a global viral pandemic wipes out over 80% of the world's population, the 218-person crew of an unaffected U.S. Navy Arleigh Burke-class guided missile destroyer, the fictional USS Nathan James (DDG-151), must try to find a cure and save humanity.

Episodes

Cast

 Rhona Mitra as Dr. Rachel Scott, a paleomicrobiologist who created the cure for the virus.
 Adam Baldwin as Commander, later Captain, and finally Admiral Mike Slattery, is the former executive officer and later commanding officer of Nathan James and chief of naval operations. Originally from Chicago, he previously served as a homicide detective with the Chicago Police Department. Slattery's son was killed by the virus, and as of season 4, his wife Christine (Ele Keats) and his daughters were still missing.
 Charles Parnell as Master Chief Petty Officer of the Navy Russell "Russ" Jeter previously served as Nathan Jamess senior enlisted sailor and unofficial chaplain.
 Travis Van Winkle as Lieutenant Daniel Joshua "Danny" Green is leader of the Naval Mountain Warfare Special Forces Unit aboard Nathan James. In season 5, Danny was a member of Delta Team, a four-man covert-action team.
 Marissa Neitling as Commander Kara Green (née Foster) started the series as a combat information center officer on Nathan James before being promoted to tactical action officer (TAO) after the death of Lt. Commander Barker. During season 3, Kara worked in St. Louis as deputy chief of staff to President Michener. In season 4, she returned to duty onboard Nathan James as the TAO.  In season 5, she became the commanding officer of Nathan James.
 Christina Elmore as Lieutenant Commander Alisha Granderson is an officer of the deck on Nathan James. In season 5, she is serving at Naval Station Mayport under Admiral Meylan. In season 5, episode 4, she is stabbed to death by her girlfriend, who is revealed to be a spy for Gran Colombia.
 John Pyper-Ferguson as Ken "Tex" Nolan is a private security/military contractor and former U.S. Army Special Forces soldier who joined the crew at Guantanamo Bay detention camp. In the season-2 finale, he tracked down his daughter, but learned that his ex-wife was killed by looters. In the third-season finale, Tex was killed stopping Allison Shaw (recurring seasons 1 and 3; starring inseason 2; guest in season 5).
 Jocko Sims as Commander Carlton Burk is head of Nathan James visit, board, search, and seizure (VBSS) teams. In season 5, he is promoted to executive officer of Nathan James. However, he is killed in the penultimate episode of the show. (recurring season 1; starring seasons 2–5)
 Kevin Michael Martin as Chief Gunner's Mate Eric Miller is a member of the ship's VBSS teams who has worked his way up the enlisted ranks (recurring seasons 1–2, starring season 3–5).
 Bren Foster as Chief Petty Officer Wolf "Wolf-Man" Taylor is a member of the Royal Australian Navy CDT 3 (Special Forces) attached to the US Navy Special Warfare Joint Operations Training Program.  In season 5, Wolf is a member of Delta Team, a four-man covert-action team (recurring season 2, starring seasons 3–5).
 Bridget Regan as Sasha Cooper, a former Navy Intelligence Officer now operating under diplomatic cover in China for the newly reformed US government, she was once romantically involved with Tom Chandler. In season 5, Sasha is a member of Delta Team (season 3–5).
 LaMonica Garrett as Lieutenant Commander Cameron Burk is the brother of CDR Carlton Burk and the TAO of USS Nathan James in season 3.  In season 4, Burk is wounded in action during an attack on Naval Station Rota, Spain, which took him off active duty (main in season 3, guest in seasons 4–5).
 Fay Masterson as Captain Andrea Garnett is the commanding officer of the USS Jeffrey Michener.  Garnett previously served as chief engineer and later executive officer of the Nathan James. Early in season 5, Captain Garnett is fatally wounded in the surprise aerial attack on Fleet Week by paramilitary forces of Gran Colombia.
 Emerson Brooks as Admiral Joseph Meylan is the former commanding officer of USS Hayward, who joins Nathan James after his ship was severely damaged by the Chinese Navy. He briefly takes command of Nathan James ordered by the St. Louis White House (secretly under control of Allison Shaw) to place Captain Chandler under arrest. In season 4, he replaces Andrea Garnett as the executive officer of USS Nathan James under Captain Mike Slattery. In season 5, he is assigned to Naval Station Mayport as a flag officer (recurring in seasons 3–4, starring in season 5).
Jodie Turner-Smith as Sergeant Azima Kandie served in the Kenyan Navy for two years; she is part of the VBSS teams on Nathan James during season 4. In season 5, Azima is a member of Delta Team (recurring in season 4, starring in season 5).

Development and production
In July 2012, TNT ordered a pilot episode for a potential series based on William Brinkley's 1988 novel The Last Ship. Hank Steinberg and Steven Kane wrote the pilot script, and Jonathan Mostow directed the pilot.

The series was produced by Channel Road Productions and Platinum Dunes, with Michael Bay, Brad Fuller, Andrew Form, Steinberg, and Kane. All seasons of the show were shot at the Culver Studios, in Culver City.

The former Atlantic liner RMS Queen Mary, now berthed at Long Beach, was also used extensively.

In May 2013, TNT placed a 10-episode order for the series. The series premiered on June 22, 2014, at 9:00 pm EDT.  On July 18, 2014, The Last Ship was renewed for a 13-episode second season. The second season started airing on June 21, 2015. On August 11, 2015, The Last Ship was renewed for a 13-episode third season, slated to premiere June 12, 2016. The season-3 premiere was postponed following the 2016 Orlando nightclub shooting because the episode also included a mass shooting in a nightclub. On July 31, 2016, The Last Ship was renewed for a 10-episode fourth season, which premiered on August 20, 2017. On September 8, 2016, TNT renewed the series for a 10-episode fifth and final season, which was filmed immediately after season four and premiered on September 9, 2018. The final episode aired on November 11, 2018.

Reception
On Metacritic, the first season has an average score of 60 out of 100 based on 22 critics, indicating "generally favorable reviews".  Rotten Tomatoes gives the show 65%, with an average rating of 6/10 based on 29 reviews, as of October 2015. The website consensus states: "Movie-sized action sequences and a pretty cast provide smooth sailing for The Last Ship, though it's not anything that hasn't been seen before."

In July 2015, Entertainment Weeklys Ray Rahman said of the second season, "The story is getting more interesting as we get an on-the-ground sense of how the pandemic-ravaged US has fared."

References

External links

The Last Ship  at TNT

 
2010s American drama television series
2014 American television series debuts
2018 American television series endings
American action television series
English-language television shows
American military television series
Nautical television series
Post-apocalyptic television series
Television shows based on American novels
Television series about families
Television series about viral outbreaks
Television series by Warner Bros. Television Studios
TNT (American TV network) original programming
Television series by Studio T
Television series about the United States Navy